George Anton Stueland was an American professional baseball pitcher who played in Major League Baseball for the Chicago Cubs in the early 1920s. A native of Algona, Iowa, he pitched in 45 games across parts of four seasons for the Cubs. He pitched right-handed.

Stueland died on September 9, 1964 in Onawa, Iowa, by falling head first and drowning in his luxury duck pond.

External links 
http://www.baseball-reference.com/s/stuelge01.shtml
http://www.usfamily.net/web/trombleyd/DakotaNotables.htm#George%20Stueland

1899 births
1964 deaths
People from Algona, Iowa
Chicago Cubs players
Baseball players from Iowa